The 2021–22 season was FC Rostov's 92nd season in existence and the club's 13th consecutive season in the top flight of Russian football. In addition to the domestic league, Rostov participated in this season's editions of the Russian Cup.

Season events
On 18 May, Rostov announced the signing of Kirill Bozhenov from Khimki on a five-year contract.

On 5 June, Rostov announced the signing of Danila Prokhin from Zenit St.Petersburg and then imeditaly loaned him out to Sochi for the season.

On 10 June, Rostov announced the permanent signing of Ali Sowe from CSKA Sofia on a contract until 2025 following a successful loan spell.

On 11 June, Rostov announced the loan signing of Nikolay Komlichenko from Dynamo Moscow for the season.

On 12 June, Rostov announced the signing of Ihor Kalinin from Ural Yekaterinburg on a five-year contract.

On 15 July, Kirill Bozhenov returned to Khimki on a season-long loan deal.

On 26 July, Kirill Shchetinin joined Rostov on loan a season-long loan deal from Zenit St.Petersburg.

On 2 August, Valeri Karpin left his role as Head Coach of Rostov. Two days later, 4 August, Rostov announced Yuri Semin as their new Head Coach on a two-year contract.

On 5 August, Rostov announced the loan-return of Bastos from Al-Ain, until the end of the season.

On 19 August, Vadim Lukyanov joined Volga Ulyanovsk on loan for the season, whilst Tomas Rukas joined Yenisey Krasnoyarsk on loan from Rostov for the season.

On 29 August, Mathias Normann joined Norwich City on a season-long loan deal, with the option to make the move permanent.

On 31 August, David Toshevski joined Górnik Zabrze on a season-long loan deal, with the option to make the move permanent.

On 25 September, Yury Syomin resigned as Head Coach of Rostov after 6weeks, with Zaur Tedeyev being appointed as Acting Head Coach on the same day. On 26 October, Vitaly Kafanov was announced as Rostov's new head coach.

Kirill Bozhenov returned to Rostov from his loan at Khimki on 18 December. Three days later, 21 December, Rostov announced that Pavel Mamayev had left the club after his contract had expired.

On 23 December, Rostov announced the signing of Magnus Knudsen to a 4.5year contract from Lillestrøm. Two days later, 25 December, Rostov announced that goalkeeper Maksim Rudakov had joined Honka on loan for the 2022 Veikkausliiga season.

On 28 December, Konstantin Kovalyov joined Baltika Kaliningrad on loan for the remainder of the season.

On 29 December, Rostov announced the signing of Aleksandr Selyava from Dinamo Minsk on a contract until the end of the season with the option of an extension.

On 18 January, Rostov announced the signing of Aleksandr Silyanov from Lokomotiv Moscow on loan for the remainder of the season.

On 20 January, Rostov announced the signing of Stepan Melnikov from Spartak Moscow to a four-and-a-half year contract.

On 9 February, Rostov announced the signing of Yegor Golenkov from Sigma Olomouc to a five year contract.

On 24 February, Rostov's home match against Krylia Sovetov was postponed due to the local airport being shut by the Federal Air Transport Agency in relation to the 2021–2022 Russo-Ukrainian crisis.

On 10 March, Valeri Karpin was re-appointed as Head Coach of Rostov, with Vitaly Kafanov returning to the position of Assistant Coach. The following day, 11 March, Dennis Hadžikadunić joined Malmö on loan until the end of 2022.

On 16 March, Rostov's postponed round 19 match against Krylia Sovetov was rescheduled for 6 April.

Squad

Contract suspensions

Out on loan

Transfers

In

Loans in

Out

Loans out

Contract suspensions

Released

Friendlies

Competitions

Overview

Premier League

League table

Results summary

Results by round

Results

Russian Cup

Round of 32

Squad statistics

Appearances and goals

|-
|colspan="14"|Players who suspended their contracts:

|-
|colspan="14"|Players away from the club on loan:

|-
|colspan="14"|Players who left Rostov during the season:

|}

Goal scorers

Clean sheets

Disciplinary record

References

FC Rostov seasons
Rostov